Väländan is a locality situated in Haninge Municipality, Stockholm County, Sweden with 469 inhabitants in 2010.

References 

Populated places in Haninge Municipality